John Wright (9 April 1615 – 29 November 1683) was an M.P. for Ipswich, between 9 November 1670 and 16 March 1685. He served with William Blois, Gilbert Lindfield and Sir John Barker, respectively.

He was originally from East London.

References

Members of the Parliament of England (pre-1707) for Ipswich
1615 births
1683 deaths
English MPs 1661–1679
English MPs 1679
English MPs 1680–1681
English MPs 1681